Paolo Vanoli (born 12 August 1972) is an Italian professional football coach and a former player who played as a left back or left midfielder. He is the manager of Italian  club Venezia.

Club career
Vanoli, a journeyman, played for many clubs, including Parma and Fiorentina (for 9 billion lire fee in co-ownership deal; €4.648 million), having also two spells abroad: Scottish Premier League club Rangers from August 2003 to January 2005, scoring once against Dundee, and Akratitos FC in Greece (2005–06).

While at Parma Vanoli won both the UEFA Cup and Coppa Italia in 1999, and then in 2001 won the Coppa Italia again with Fiorentina, this time beating his former team Parma in the final. Vanoli scored in all three finals.

International career
Vanoli was also an Italian international, playing twice and scoring once on his debut in a 3–1 defeat against Belgium in 1999.

Managerial career
Between 2016 and 2017, Vanoli was the assistant manager of the Italy national football team. He was then appointed as assistant manager of Chelsea FC, serving in the role from 2017 to 2018.

On 17 December 2021, Vanoli joined Spartak Moscow as manager, signing a contract until the end of the 2022–23 season. On 29 May 2022, Spartak won the 2021–22 Russian Cup. The club announced on 9 June 2022 that Vanoli had left his post, citing a number of circumstances beyond the club's control.

On 7 November 2022, Vanoli was hired as the new head coach of Serie B struggling club Venezia, signing a contract until 30 June 2024.

Managerial record

Honours

Player
Parma
UEFA Cup: 1998–99
Coppa Italia: 1998–99
Supercoppa Italiana: 1999

Fiorentina
Coppa Italia: 2000–01

Manager
Spartak Moscow
Russian Cup: 2021–22

Personal life
He has a older brother, Rodolfo, who is also a former footballer and current coach.

References

External links
 uefa.com short bio
 
 FIGC profile 

1972 births
Living people
Sportspeople from Varese
Italian footballers
Italy international footballers
Association football fullbacks
Hellas Verona F.C. players
Parma Calcio 1913 players
ACF Fiorentina players
Bologna F.C. 1909 players
Rangers F.C. players
L.R. Vicenza players
S.S.D. Varese Calcio players
Venezia F.C. players
A.P.O. Akratitos Ano Liosia players
Scottish Premier League players
Serie A players
Serie B players
Super League Greece players
Expatriate footballers in Greece
Expatriate footballers in Scotland
Italian expatriate sportspeople in Greece
Italian expatriate sportspeople in Scotland
Italian expatriate footballers
UEFA Cup winning players
Footballers from Lombardy
Italian football managers
FC Spartak Moscow managers
Serie B managers
Venezia F.C. managers
Italian expatriate football managers
Expatriate football managers in Russia
Italian expatriate sportspeople in Russia